Chennai International Airport  is an international airport serving the city of Chennai, Tamil Nadu and its metropolitan area. The airport is the 6th busiest airport in India It was also 49th busiest airport in Asia in 2018 making it one of the four major airports in India under the top 50 list of 2018. In financial year 2021, the airport handled over 9.5 million passengers.

The airport is served by the airport metro station of the Chennai Metro and the Tirusulam railway station of the Chennai Suburban Railway system. To cope with the passenger traffic, two new terminals, including one satellite terminal, are under construction to handle 40 million passengers per year. Once completed, it will be India's first airport to have a satellite terminal. The new satellite terminal will be connected through a four way underground walkalator for passenger movement across different terminals. Still, the Tirusulam airport complex is expected to reach saturation by 2035, with a peak capacity of 40 million passengers, and a proposal for a new greenfield airport in Parandur has been approved. Once the new airport is commissioned, both the airports will be functional.

The older domestic and international blocks 2 and 3 were named after former Chief Ministers of Tamil Nadu K. Kamaraj and C. N. Annadurai, respectively. It was the first airport in India to have international and domestic terminals located adjacent to each other. It was designed by Creative Group, an India-based architecture firm. The airport serves as the southern regional headquarters of the Airports Authority of India (AAI) for South India comprising the states of Tamil Nadu, Andhra Pradesh, Kerala, and the union territories of Puducherry and Lakshadweep.

History

First test flight in Madras
The aviation history of the city began in 1910, when a city-based Corsican hotelier Giacomo D'Angelis built an aircraft and tested it in Island Grounds. Inspired by Frenchman, Louis Blériot, the first to fly across English Channel in July 1909, D'Angelis collaborated with Simpson's, a leading coach-builder in the city, to build a biplane. The biplane was built entirely from D'Angelis's own designs, fitted with a small horse-power engine. Samuel John Green, a motor engineer at Simpson's, helped with the manufacture and assembly of the biplane. On 10 March 1910, D'Angelis tested the aircraft in the suburb of Pallavaram, making it the first flight ever in Asia. While demonstrating it to the public during the ticketed show, he even took a person from the crowd on the aircraft as his passenger. Immediately, he also arranged a public viewing at the Island Grounds, charging entrance fees for the demonstration.

The interest in flying among prominent residents of the city resulted in the arrival of a set of aviators in 1911 to display the flying machines they had brought with them to India as a marketing initiative. The aviators included Baron de Caters and Jules Tyck. On 15 February 1911, Tyck flew in a Blériot aeroplane in front of the public. The aircraft was wheeled out by eight men with Tyck seated inside the craft wearing an oilskin coat and goggles. The men held the plane till its engine revved up and then let go, and the craft darted forward about 20 yards before rising into the air. In the air, the craft made a straight flight only for about three-quarters of the length of the ground and descended due to poor weather. Tyck flew again the next day, this time reaching a height of 2,400 feet, which was witnessed by the then Governor of Madras Sir Arthur Lawley. Two days later, on 18 February, another demonstration was given by Pierre de Caters, when he flew his aircraft in public.

Early commercial aviation history in India
The history of civil aviation in India began in December 1912, with the opening of the first domestic air route between Karachi and Delhi by the Indian state Air services in collaboration with the Imperial Airways, United Kingdom. However, it was just an extension of London–Karachi flight of the Imperial Airways. In 1915, the first Indian airline, Tata Air Mail, started a regular airmail service between Karachi and Madras without any patronage from the government, marking the beginning of air transportation in the southern part of India.

A test flight was conducted at the Island Grounds in 1914, when J. W. Madley, a water works engineer, tested an aircraft assembled by him. He flew it over the Red Hills Reservoir to inspect works and shot a couple of aerial photographs of the reservoir from the aircraft.

Madras Flying Club

In March 1930, a discussion initiated by pilot G. Vlasto led to the founding of Madras Flying Club, which became a pioneer in South India. The club had 71 founding members, of whom 14 were Indians. Flt Lt H N Hawker became the club's first flight instructor. The club's first Indian chief pilot instructor, Mohammed Ismail Khan, trained several pilots, some of whom were trained professionally or others simply for fun. When the state council of Ceylon built an aerodrome at Ratmalana near Colombo in 1935, the first flight to land there was flown by chief flying instructor of the club Tyndale Biscoe. On 26 October 1936, Captain V. Sundaram, who got the first commercial pilot licence in India, flew a de Havilland Dove aircraft from Karachi to Madras.

First commercial flight
On 15 October 1932, when J. R. D. Tata, founder of Tata Sons Ltd, flew a single-engined de Havilland carrying air mail (postal mail of Imperial Airways) from Karachi's Drigh Road Aerodrome to Bombay's Juhu Airstrip via Ahmedabad, the flight was continued to Madras via Bellary piloted by aviator Nevill Vintcent.

Military use

The following units were here at some point with the base being called "St. Thomas Mount":
 No. 1 Coast Defence Flight Indian Air Force (IAF) Volunteer Reserve (1940–42) became No. 101 (Coast Defence) Flight IAF
 No. 101 Coast Defence Flight IAF (1942) became No. 101 (General Reconnaissance) Squadron IAF

Airport terminals
Madras Airport was one of the first airports of India, commissioned in 1930. The airport was built on land donated by the former governor of Madras Presidency, K. Sriramulu Naidu. Although the first aircraft landed in Madras Airport in 1930, the usage was confined only to military operations during World War II. In 1952, the Civil Aviation Department took over its operations followed by the AAI in 1972.

The first passenger art deco–style terminal was completed in 1954 on the northeastern side of Meenambakkam village, thus being referred to as Meenambakkam Airport. In the early 80s, a new terminal was built at Tirusulam and passenger operations were shifted. The new domestic terminal (named Kamaraj Terminal 2) was commissioned in 1985 and the international terminal (named Anna Terminal 3) was commissioned in 1989. The old terminal building became known as Terminal 1 until 2013 and is now used as a cargo terminal for Blue Dart Aviation.

An air cargo complex was commissioned on 1 February 1978 for processing of import, export, and transshipment cargo, in addition to unaccompanied luggage, which is the second gateway air cargo terminal in the country after the one at Kolkata Airport. In November 1988, British Airways inaugurated a link to London, Chennai's first route to Europe. Flights stopped in Kuwait and were operated by Lockheed L-1011s in the beginning. In April 1991, the airline started performing the flight nonstop with Boeing 747 aircraft.

On 23 September 1999, a centre for flowers, fruits and vegetables was commissioned at the cargo terminal. In 2001, Chennai Airport received ISO 9001-2000 certification, the first such international airport in India. During the early days, Madras Airport was one of the largest airports in India handling many international flight connections.

Delta Air Lines' maiden flight from New York City via Paris touched down in May 2005. Boeing 767s operated the service. The following November, however, the carrier stopped serving Chennai. Instead of flying to India via Paris, it had decided to commence a direct flight from New York to Mumbai and hand the Chennai–Paris route over to its partner Air France. In 2008, the AAI started major modernisation of the airport.

Administration

Chennai Airport is the regional headquarters of the Airports Authority of India (AAI) for the southern region of India comprising the states of Tamil Nadu, Andhra Pradesh, Karnataka, and Kerala, as well as the union territories of Puducherry and Lakshadweep. It functions from the ATC Complex within the airport and has 49 airports under its control, including 19 operational AAI airports, 5 operational private/joint venture airports, 5 non-operational airports, 12 military airports, and 8 disused airfields. These include 6 international airports, 15 domestic airports, and 3 customs airports.

Chennai Airport is the centre of the southern flight information region (FIR), one of the four FIRs that the Indian air space is divided into. The regional executive director (RED) is responsible for the air traffic services over the Chennai FIR and airport management on ground at the airports in South India. The Chennai FIR includes terrestrial air space above the five southern states and two southern union territories and the oceanic air space of the southern part of the Bay of Bengal and the eastern part of the Arabian Sea. Coordination with the neighbouring national FIRs of Kolkata and Mumbai and with the neighbouring international FIRs of Sri Lanka, Kuala Lampur, and Yangon for air traffic control purposes are being made with telecommunication links (both voice and data). The immigration services at the airport are handled by the Bureau of Immigration.

Security
Chennai Airport is the home to the southern regional office of the Bureau of Civil Aviation Security (BCAS), whose main responsibilities include instituting standards and measures with respect to security of civil flights at international and domestic airports in India. Security of the airport is provided by the Airport Sector (CISF), that includes a dog squad. The dogs are trained to sniff and identify IEDs and narcotics. While working with the bomb disposal squad they screen the bags left unattended. As of today, the CISF team in charge of Chennai Airport security has a dog squad of 9 dogs.

Privatisation
The Government of India has proposed to offer a contract to a private operator to maintain and operate the daily operations of the airport. AAI recently invited bids for the same and various firms including Tata, Fraport, Celebi, Sahara, GMR, GVK, and Essar have shown interest. The airport employees are protesting against the move fearing job losses.

Facilities

Structure
Spread over an area 1323 acres, Chennai International Airport consists of three terminals: the old terminal at Meenambakkam (Terminal 1) used for cargo, and the two terminals of the passenger terminal complex at Tirusulam (Terminals 2 and 3) used for domestic and international passenger operations, respectively.

Passenger terminals
Today, the passenger terminal complex consists of the newer domestic and international terminals interconnected by the older international block which today houses administrative offices and a restaurant. Although the complex is one continuous structure, it was built incrementally, Anna Terminal (Terminal 3) was added in 1988 to the pre-existing Kamaraj Terminal (Terminal 2).
Terminals 1 and 2

The first part to be built was the Kamaraj domestic terminal (Terminal 2) which had two aero-bridges, making it the first airport in India to have aero-bridges at the domestic terminal. Later, the Anna international terminal (Terminal 3) was built with three aero-bridges. After the completion of the international terminal, the old terminal (Terminal 1) at Meenambakkam was used exclusively for cargo.

Terminals 3 and 4
Recently, the international terminal was extended further west by adding a new block which includes three aero-bridges. At present, the new international block (Terminal 4) is used for departures while the older Anna Terminal (Terminal 3) is used for arrivals.

The international and the domestic terminals cover an area of 1.5 km2 and 1.8 km2, respectively. The airport is divided into two circles, with five zones each, for administrative conveniences. Around 550 acres of the airport premises fall within the St. Thomas Mount and Pallavaram Cantonment Board's limits. The rest of the area comes under the Meenambakkam town panchayat's jurisdiction. There are four entry gates at the airport, two each at both the terminals. There are 5 X-ray baggage facilities at the domestic terminal and 2 at the international terminal. The total area of retail space at the existing domestic and international terminals is 3,250 sq m, comprising 60 concessions including duty-free retail shops, restaurants, snack bars, and executive lounges. The Anna international terminal has 6 boarding gates on the first floor. The Kamaraj domestic terminal has a total of 9 boarding gates, including 6 on the ground floor and 3 on the first floor. The airport has 24 taxiways, including the 411-metre-long taxiway M on the southern side commissioned in March 2017, capable of handling 36 aircraft movements per hour. In January 2018, the airport began cross-runway operations to avoid flight delays, increasing aircraft movements from 36 to 42 an hour.

The airport currently has 70 parking bays, one of which can accommodate the super-jumbo Airbus A380. Parking bays at the domestic terminal include one in-contact bay for Airbus A300-sized aircraft, nine in-contact bays for Airbus A320/Boeing 737-sized aircraft, and 49 remote bays for A320/737-sized aircraft. Parking bays at the international terminal include seven in-contact bays for Boeing 747-sized aircraft, 13 remote bays for 747-sized aircraft, one remote bay for an A380 aircraft, and three cargo bays for 747-sized aircraft. Works on the 24 new night parking bays had been completed in the apron area. With the new parking bays, the Chennai Airport has 81 parking bays.

Expansion and Modernization Phase I
The airport was modernised and expanded in 2013, with the construction of a new international terminal (Terminal 4), the renovation of the existing Anna international terminal (Terminal 3), the construction of a new domestic terminal (Terminal 1), the extension of the secondary runway, and the creation of a parallel runway, taxiways, aprons, parking bays, and cargo terminal. The new terminals spread across  and have 72 passenger check-in counters. However, the plan for the parallel runway has been dropped.

The original plan to build a three-basement-level car parking for about 1,500 vehicles with about 8,000 sq m of commercial area on the open ground opposite the new domestic terminal building has been deferred temporarily. Instead, a surface-level parking to accommodate 400 vehicles has been planned at a cost of 44.2 million.

The terminal complex will have a flyover travellator connecting the existing newer terminals for a distance of about 1 km. It will have an elevated road on the top and a tube below which will have two walkalators which will connect the three brand new terminals together. The 600 m long walkalator belt was installed on 14 April 2018 at a cost of 260 million.

Expansion and Modernization Phase II

The current development projects include construction of a brand new integrated terminal in place of the older Terminals 2 and 3 which currently lie in between the two newer Terminals 1 and 4. The design is a collaborative effort of team lead involving Frederic Schwartz Architects, Gensler, and led by New Delhi-based Creative Group. Creative Group is the principal architect for the project providing comprehensive architecture and engineering consultancy for the design of the passenger terminal building, parking garage structures, and the roadway access system. The proposed design, based on Gensler's Terminal 2015 concept, will be connected with the design elements of the existing Terminals 1 and 4. It was reported that the new terminal building will have a handling capacity of 10 million passengers and when integrated with the existing terminals, it will provide for a handling capacity of 23 million passengers a year. The new terminal building is expected to have an area of about 1,40,000 m2 with 104 check-in counters, 16 aero-bridges, and 60 immigration counters, and the two runways would be interconnected by a network of taxiways. The 24,760-million expansion programme commenced on 11 July 2018 and will be completed by 14 April 2023. Once completed, it will serve as the airport's sole integrated terminal alongside the newer Terminals 1 and 4.
Design

The design details of the runways are handled by the Airports Authority of India, while architecture firms are limited to designing buildings on the land side of the runway. The present proposal is parallel to the existing runway. The entire design as being organised around "two lush sustainable gardens" and the wing-like roofs helps collect rainwater and become part of the garden.

The domestic terminal building currently measures  and handles 4.74 million passengers a year. The revamped design of the domestic terminal building will accommodate twice as many passengers in a three-storey structure 984 ft long. The new design, based on the organisation of security and passenger circulation, centres around two lush, ecologically sustainable gardens each measuring nearly an acre and includes a parking garage with a green roof over 300 m long and rainwater capture systems collectively known as the "green gate" of the terminal. Expansive glass curtain walls will be incorporated to boost the feeling of airiness and spaciousness, as will skylights. The new terminal will have three levels. The departure area will be featured on the top level with the arrivals section on ground level. The arrivals section will form the base for airlines and other offices with the basement reserved for luggage scanners. The domestic terminal covers 67,700 sq m and will also have a provision of seven gates, two hard-stand hold rooms, and 52 check-in counters, besides eight counters for e-ticketing. The international terminal will cover 59,300 sq m with the provision of two gates with multiple hard-stand hold rooms, 52 check-in counters, eight counters for e-ticketing, 18/10 immigration/custom counters for handling passenger arrivals, and 18 immigration counters for departing passengers. Both the terminals will be equipped with an in-line baggage handling system capable of Level 4 security screening system. This system consists of four departure conveyors of a total length of 3,500 m and can handle 1,200 baggages per hour.

The new terminal buildings are expected to cater to 14 million more passengers per annum, including 4 million per annum at the international terminals. With the existing terminals handling 9 million, the airport will be able to handle 23 million passengers per annum after the integration with 16 million in domestic and 7 million in the international terminal. After expansion, the aircraft movements in the airport is likely to increase at the rate of 5 to 7%. By 2020–21, the airport is expected to handle 700 movements a day. The new terminals are expected to clock between 72 and 75 green points of the total 100 for integrated inhabited assessment. The AAI has divided the building for land-side and air-side operations. The spaces are connected with a central security checkpoint for departure and there is a glass bridge on each side of the building for arriving passengers. On the roadside, the new terminals are connected with an elevated corridor, which will have approach and exit ramps. The power requirement at the expanded airport is around 110 kV•A – more than three times the current needs. A new 11,000 kV sub-station has been built by the Tamil Nadu Generation and Distribution Corporation (TANGEDCO) at the airport to serve the terminals, for which the power has been sourced from Kadapperi near Tambaram. The retail space earmarked in the new international and domestic terminals is about 9,000 sq m, nearly thrice as much as the existing one.
Accidents and Controversies
In recent years, there were many reported incidents of ceiling collapses and glass door and window breakages due to the poor quality and improper design of work during the recent modernisation of the airport terminals. The first incident happened on 13 May 2013 when 20 panels caved in near the security hold area due to heavy winds, followed by another incident on 11 August when 23 panels behind the check-in counters at the terminal crashed due to heavy condensation. The last reported incident of a ceiling collapse happened in late April 2015, bringing the total number of incidents to an abnormal 45. As of 11 August 2015, the number of incidents have reached 50 which has been a point of discussion in social networking sites.

Cargo complex
The Air Cargo Complex at the Chennai Airport was established in 1978, when all regulatory and facilitating agencies were brought under one roof for faster processing/clearance of international cargo, to cater for air cargo movement in the southern region. At the cargo terminal, AAI functions as ground handling agency for airlines for handling or processing their cargo on ground and acts as custodian on behalf of customs import/export cargo under the customs act of 1962. Spread over an area of 19.5 acres, the complex uses cargo-handling equipments such as elevated transfer vehicle, forklifts, high-mast stackers, and power hydraulic pallet trucks for handling cargo. The covered area of the export wing of the complex is 20,595 sq m while that of the import wing is 20,090 sq m. The existing covered area of cargo terminal in occupation of AAI is 37,085 sq m. There are three ETV build-up/working stations and 18 manual build-up ETV loading positions at the complex.

The cargo complex consists of two divisions, namely, the export and the import facilities. The export facility covers an area of 16,366 sq m and the import facility covers 16,500 sq m. The complex has an exclusive cargo apron which can accommodate three wide-bodied aircraft with ULD parking area and hydrant-refuelling facility at the bay. The Customs department has appointed AAI and AI as the custodian at the complex. The import cargo of all the airlines is solely handled by AAI. The export cargo, on the other hand, is handled by AAI in respect of airlines handled by it while those of the rest of the airlines are handled by AI.

The available capacity and cargo handled at the terminal are listed below:

The existing capacity of the air cargo complex is expected to meet the requirement till 2020. Phase III and IV of the new integrated cargo terminal with latest automated storage and retrieval system is under construction, enhancing the area from 35,920 sq m to 54,620 sq m.

The upcoming import cargo storage and processing facility would have a capacity to handle almost 800,000 tonnes of cargo annually from the existing 300,000 tonnes. The new complex will have an area of 58,000 sq m against the current area of 26,000 sq m. The conventional way of warehouse management will be replaced by automated storage and retrieval system (ASRS) The ASRS would have over 8,000 storage bins and each bin would have a capacity to store 1.3 to 1.5 tonnes of cargo in it. Apart from ASRS, the upcoming facilities would also have multiple temperature-controlled cold storages for perishable cargo, with three chambers at 0 to 12 °C covering a total area of 445 sq m. There would be three fully secured strong rooms for storage and processing of high value cargo, such as gems, jewellery, gold and silver, both in export and import together. The new facility would also have dedicated isolated storage locations for handling dangerous and hazardous cargo.

In 2009, an integrated cargo complex was planned in the cargo complex of the airport. The complex would be constructed, at a cost of 1,450 million, in 15 months. While the ground floor would measure 21,000 sq m, the first floor would be built on 12,100 sq m. The new building would be used exclusively for import activities. Once the civil works were completed, the ASRS would be installed. It would cost 750 million.

Air traffic control tower
Chennai is the home to India's biggest air traffic control (ATC) centre. The ATC tower is located at the Air Traffic Services Complex. There are two radars in Chennai—the mono-pulse secondary surveillance radar at Porur and the Chennai Westing House (terminal) radar. Advance surface movement guidance and control system has been introduced in the ATC tower.

As a first step towards integrating the entire airspace in the country, the automation system at the ATC in Chennai Airport was commissioned on 1 October 2011. The AAI has invested 420 million for the Chennai automation system, which runs on Auto Track 3+, a sophisticated air traffic control automation system supplied and installed by US-based Raytheon Technologies. A new route radar at Porur has also been installed and the 13-year-old terminal radar at the airport will be replaced. With the automation system in place, all information regarding tower control, approach control, area control and oceanic control would be exchanged electronically in Chennai. It would ensure reliability, thereby enhancing safety of aircraft and passengers.

Chennai is among the four flight information centres in the country besides Mumbai, Delhi and Kolkata, and the Chennai ATC has Hyderabad, Mangaluru, Thiruvananthapuram and Bangalore under its control. Besides the two radars in Chennai, radar systems in Mangaluru, Bangalore, Bangalore HAL, Shamshabad (Hyderabad), Bellary and Thiruvananthapuram are included in the new system. With the advanced integrated radar technology, ATC in Chennai now has the entire South Indian region on its radar screens, mainly co-ordinating flight movements above 26,000 to 46,000 ft.

Following the Performance-based navigation system (PBN) and the air traffic control automation, in 2011, the AAI initiated a pilot project on a Ground-based augmentation system (GBAS), as part of implementing Gagan (Geo Augmented Navigation) in the country. There will be a set of 3–4 GPS satellites, one geo-synchronous satellite, GPS receivers at end of the runways, a ground station and a VHF data broadcast system. When the pilot project starts, Chennai Airport will be the first airport in the country to have the facility.

Runways

Approach lights include CAT-1 category at runway 07 and CAT-1 type at runway 25 for 510 m. Precision Approach Path Indicator (PAPI)-type landing aids are available in all the runways. Routine maintenance work of the primary runway is carried out twice a week—between 2.30 pm and 4.30 pm on Tuesdays and Saturdays.

Chennai Airport does not have rapid exit taxiways that help pilots to vacate a runway without slowing down the aircraft soon after landing. Planes such as the Airbus A380 and Boeing 747-8 will have to slow down completely to negotiate sharp turns on the taxiway. In 2011, AAI began work on upgrading the existing taxiways and parking bays at the airport to handle these jumbo planes.

The secondary runway, which was initially 2,035 m long, was closed in 2009 to extend it over the Adyar River by means of a bridge over the watercourse at a cost of 4,300 million. Initially, 126.59 acres of land for second runway was handed over to the AAI. In March 2011, by acquiring 136 acres of land from the state government, AAI completed extension of the 2,035 m secondary runway by 1,400 m, whose commissioning, initially planned to be by November 2011, has been delayed as the approach lighting system has not been installed. While the cost of extending the runway was projected to be about 2,400 million, that of the bridge is almost 2,300 million. A bridge has been constructed across the Adyar River to extend the secondary runway by a length of 1,400 m to a total length of 3,445 m, including 835 m on the northern side of the river. The bridge accommodates the runway and a taxiway, making Chennai Airport the only international airport in India to have a runway across a river. In Mumbai, only an end of the runway is over Mithi River. When the AAI recommissions the secondary runway, Chennai Airport will join the league of airports with a functional runway across a river.

With a new airport under consideration, the project for a parallel runway has been put on hold and the total land required for the airport expansion reduced from 1,069.99 acres to 800 acres. AAI planned to operate 2,400 m even after removing obstructions. About 2,085 m of the runway was earlier used for landing only smaller aircraft, like ATR types. In February 2012, airport authorities announced that only about 2,160 m of the secondary runway would be operational as there will be 330 m permanent displacement at GST road side and 780 m displacement at the other end. This restricted length would be enough to operate Airbus A320 and Boeing 737 aircraft without load penalty. Bad planning by the airport authorities, which has resulted in the removal of the very-high-frequency omni range equipment (VOR) from its original location where a link way has been constructed between the main and the secondary runways, has been considered the reason behind the delay.

The present runway occupancy time at the airport (the time an aircraft spends on the runway) is around 70 seconds. By October 2018, the runway occupancy time will be reduced to 60 seconds, with the completion of the ongoing runway development works.

In 2018, the airport acquired 151 acres for expansion works from neighbouring areas including Kolappakkam, Manappakkam, St. Thomas Mount and Cowl Bazaar. Expansion works includes installation of simple approach lighting systems for secondary runway, construction of hangars and parallel taxi track for the airport, fuel farm, installation of CAT 1 approach lighting system for the main runway, and a wide-aperture localiser antenna.

Passenger vehicle parking

As of 2018, the existing parking lot at the airport can accommodate 1,200 cars. In June 2018, an 2,500-million multi-level car park with a capacity to accommodate 2,237 cars was planned at both ends of the Airport Metro Rail station in front of the airport on a 4.25-acre plot. It will have a built-up area of one million square feet and will be 27 metres tall with six levels. In addition, a 250,000-square-feet mall will be built by the Olympia Group and Larsen & Toubro in 18 months. The mall will have a 238,100-square-feet cinema multiplex and a 35,678-square-feet 59-key transit hotel facility. The parking facility will be connected to the travelator linking the international and domestic terminals. Construction began in March 2019 and was completed in December 2021 after several delays due to the COVID-19 pandemic impact. It is expected to open in July 2022 after going through a trial run.

Airlines and destinations
Domestic flights operate from Terminal 1, international departures operate from Terminal 4, while the older Terminal 3 is used for international arrivals. The old terminal at Meenambakkam is used for cargo operations.

Passenger

Cargo

Statistics

Fixed-base operators

Flight kitchen and caterers
TajSATS, a joint-venture of the Indian Hotels Company and SATS (formerly known as Singapore Airport Terminal Services) provides in-flight catering at Chennai Airport. TajSATS adheres to ISO 22000:2005 standards and achieved Halal Certification. It also manages airport lounges in Chennai and Mumbai airports. The airline lounges at Chennai Airport include Maharaja Lounge at the international terminal and the Indian Airlines Lounge at the domestic terminal. The Taj Madras Flight Kitchen, a joint-venture of the Indian Hotels, SATS and Malaysia Airlines started in 1994, is situated at GST Road, Pallavaram, and operates airport restaurants at the airport. The Taj Madras Flight Kitchen also has a multi-cuisine restaurant with a full-fledged bar named 'Flights of Fancy' at the airport serving snacks and refreshments.

MRO hangar facility
In 2008, Simplifly Deccan opened a US$2.9 million maintenance, repair and overhaul (MRO) hangar at Chennai International Airport. The 70,000 sq ft facility can handle one A320 or two ATR aircraft and provides basic- and medium-level maintenance checks and protective storage for Deccan and Kingfisher Airlines aircraft and functions as a repair shop and assembly area. The hangar, which took nearly two years to build, has a total construction area of 3,200 sq m. The maintenance hall spans 46 m wide, 54 m deep and 17 m high. The hangar has space for one Airbus A320 and 2 ATR aircraft at one time. It is equipped with an engineering and training facility and an engineering maintenance conference room.

Duty-free shops
The airport houses many duty-free shops and restaurants in its lobby. The authority is planning to open more shops in the premises. It is said that around 18,500 sq ft of space is available for shops. Recently, Flemingo International, Dubai was given the contract to open duty-free shops in both the International and Domestic terminals.

Connectivity

The airport is situated on the Grand Southern Trunk Road (National Highway 32), a major national highway connecting several cities within the state. The airport is served by Tirusulam railway station on the Suburban railway network. Airport prepaid taxis are available round the clock, with moderate fares fixed by the government. The airport metro station of the Chennai Metro connects the airport to other parts of the city, making it the second airport in India to be connected to a metro system. Shuttle services between the metro station and the terminals are provided for the passengers. In future, the concourse of the metro station will be linked to the passenger terminals by means of a connector tube connecting the metro station to the flyover at the terminals, so that passengers alighting from the train can go to the departure area of the airport terminals without coming out of the station building. The Tirusulam suburban train station will also be integrated with the metro station and the airport. A flyover at the entrance of the airport helps the traffic on GST road bypass the entrance. The Kathipara grade-separator at Guindy facilitates the traffic flowing from the city centre onto the airport side.

In 2018, a 600-meter-long travelator connecting the terminals was opened at a cost of 800 million.

Greenery
A vertical garden was constructed in the terminals at a cost of 400 million. The garden has about 40 different varieties of plants. The garden is visible from the terminals and also the connecting tube that links the landside to the airside (the area closer to the runway). The garden is watered using the drip irrigation method.

Future expansion

Expansion of present airport
An integrated simulator will be installed at Chennai Airport, which will be the first of its kind in the country, at a cost of 200 million. The equipment will be set up at the Air Traffic Services complex.

In January 2018, a satellite terminal near the second runway was planned to be built in 3 years. A 1.5 km tunnel to connect the satellite terminal with the main buildings has been planned at a cost of 7,000 million. This tunnel will run at a depth of 10.5 feet below the ground.

Following the 23,000 million phase I expansion that began in 2007 and completed in 2013, the phase II expansion comes at a cost of 25,870 million is expected to begin in 2018, aimed to be completed in 42 months by September 2021. This will expand the area to 160,000 m2, with a capacity of 35 million passengers, up from the existing capacity of 18 million. With the completion, the new building will serve as the sole integrated terminal alongside the existing newer domestic and international terminals.

As of July 2018, the AAI had acquired 130 acres of land for the expansion of the present airport, and acquisition of another 101 acres of land is in progress.

Construction of the new integrated terminal is under progress and completion is expected by December 2022, which was delayed due to the COVID-19 pandemic. Commission will be done in two phases, the primary at June 2021. Automatic boarding, additional food courts, expansive baggage claim and arrival area, extra greenery, and state-of-the-art architecture designs are features of the new terminal. Officials say with this they will be able to surpass the present service rank of the airport, which was lacked in poor maintenance, both nationally and internationally.

The airport lagged in star ratings a lot behind other comparative major airports like Bangalore, Kolkata, and Hyderabad in Skytrax Airport Awards and other reviews due to its insufficient terminal space and sanitization facilities at restrooms.

New greenfield airport at Parandur

The four-runway second airport is proposed to be built on 4,823 acres near Sriperumbudur, southwest of Chennai, at an estimated cost of 35,000 million in the first phase and Second phase has not been disclosed. To be built in two phases, the anticipated expenditure for phase I of the project is 40,000 million with an 87,000 sq m terminal along with a parking space for 750 vehicles. The second phase involves 1,50,000 sq m of terminal and enhancing parking space to accommodate 1,500 vehicles at an investment of 14,750 million. The greenfield airport will be able to handle 40 million passengers per annum.

As of September 2019, the State government has shortlisted six locations for the second international airport. These include Thiruporur (40 km from the present airport), Vallathur (70 km), Thodur (55 km), Mappedu (46 km), Cheyyar (90 km), and Maduramangalam (55 km). 
 
In August 2022, the state government finally selected Parandur in Kanchipuram district as location for the new greenfield airport. The New Chennai Greenfield International Airport in Parandur, will take a minimum 5 to 7 years to be built.
Apart from the expansion of the existing airport at Tirusulam, the new greenfield airport at Parandur would come up on 4970 acres of land.

Awards
The airport was ranked in the third place as the Best Airport by Size in the category of 15-25 million passengers per annum by Airports Council International in 2017. It was awarded as the Best Tourist Friendly Airport by Tamil Nadu Tourism from the Ministry of Tourism two consecutive times, in 2016 and 2018. It was awarded the Gold Award by the survey of RoSPA Health and Safety Awards for ensuring proper hygienic conditions and safety from accidents and incidents, as well as the Sword of Honour by the British Safety Council for ensuring safety and security, both for the airport's Phase-II of modernization, in 2020. It was ranked in the eighth place among the most punctual airports in the world, globally, by ensuring timely takeoffs and landings to and from the airport, in 2021 by Cirium, an aviation data analytics company.

Accidents and Incidents
 In August 1984, a bomb blast 1,200 m from the airport killed 33 persons and injured 27 others. It was in the older terminal building situated near Meenambakkam railway station. The entire concourse was razed down and had to be rebuilt.
 On 29 September 1986, Indian Airlines flight IC 571, an Airbus A300b2-1c (registration VT-ELV), on a routine flight from Chennai to Mumbai, aborted take-off due to a bird-strike and suffered a runway excursion. No fatalities were reported. The aircraft was damaged beyond repair.
 On 5 March 1999, Air France flight 6745, an ex-UTA Boeing 747-2B3F (SCD) freighter (registration F-GPAN) carrying a revenue load of 66 tonnes of cargo from Charles de Gaulle Airport [CDG], Paris to Madras [MAA] via Karachi [KHI] and Bangalore [BLR] crash-landed, caught fire and burned out. Madras ATC had cleared the aircraft for an ILS approach to the airport's runway 07. The crew abandoned the approach due to technical difficulties and the aircraft circled to attempt a second approach. At the end of the second approach, the aircraft's nose struck the runway while touching down because its nose gear was not locked. The plane skidded and came to rest 7,000 feet (2,100 m) down the  runway. After it had come to a standstill, the crew noticed smoke on the flight deck and began to extinguish the flames. Soon after, flames erupted in the aircraft's front section. One crew member managed to escape from the flight deck via a rope ladder. The remaining four crew members were rescued by the airport fire service from the rear, before the flames engulfed the entire aircraft. The fire service was unable to extinguish the fire and the aircraft burned out.

2015 Chennai floods

In December 2015, unprecedented rainfall associated with India's North-east monsoon caused extensive flooding of the airport tarmac and runways. The airport was closed for a week to all traffic by the AAI from the evening of 1 December until noon on 6 December. About 1,500 passengers and 2,000 airport workers were evacuated as water entered terminal buildings and 30-35 aircraft were stranded on the apron. Military authorities permitted the use of Naval Air Station INS Rajali in Arakkonam, 70 km (43 mi) west of central Chennai and Tambaram Air Force Station 20 km (12 mi) south as relief airports for a limited service of civilian commercial flights as well as official rescue/assistance flights. Additionally, Indian Air Force evacuated passengers from Chennai Airport to the two military bases for onward journeys on Air Force transport aircraft to other domestic destinations. On 5 December, the Directorate General of Civil Aviation permitted a partial re-opening of the airport during daylight hours under visual meteorological conditions only, allowing airlines to ferry stranded aircraft out of Chennai without passengers or cargo on board. Operations under instrument meteorological conditions were not permitted. Rescue and assistance flights, however, were permitted to operate in and out of the airport.

See also
 Transport in Chennai
 Airports in India
 Air transport in India
 List of busiest airports in India by passenger traffic
 List of airlines of India
 Chennai greenfield airport, Parandur

References

Citations

Bibliography

External links

 
 Unofficial website
 

Airports in Tamil Nadu
International airports in India
1948 establishments in India
Airports established in 1948
Memorials to C. N. Annadurai
Transport in Chennai
Buildings and structures in Chennai
World War II sites in India
20th-century architecture in India